FMCA may refer to:
Family Motor Coach Association
Fixed-Mobile Convergence Alliance
Federal Magistrates Court